Alwali Jauji Kazir CFR (born 2 August 1947) is a retired Nigerian Army Major General who was Military Governor of Kwara State, Nigeria from December 1989 to January 1992 during the military regime of Major General Ibrahim Babangida. And then Chief of Army Staff from August 1994 to March 1996 during General Sani Abacha’s regime.

Early life
Kazir was born in Kazir Village, Jakusko L.G.A in present-day Yobe State. He attended Amshi Primary School between 1955 and 1957 and Gashua Central Primary School in 1958.

Military career
As a brigadier general, he was the director of army faculty at the Armed Forces Command and Staff College, Jaji in 1992. After the sudden dismissal of Major General Chris Alli as the Chief of Army Staff, Alwali Kazir then the GOC 1 Division was promoted major general and made Chief of Army Staff serving from August 1994 to March 1996 during the regime of General Sani Abacha. Alwali Kazir retired in 1996.

Later career
After retirement, he was installed as Madakin Bade by the Emir of Bade Alhaji Abubakar Umar Suleiman in April 2009.

Family
Alwali Kazir was married to Late Aisha Larai Bukar with whom he has one child Muhammad, and Hajara with whom he has 6 children namely: Halima, Abdulazeez, Ibrahim, Musa, Mubarak and Maryam, and 10 grandchildren: Alwali (Najeeb), Aisha, Hajara (Nabila), Maryam, Amina, Muhammed, Abubakar, Hajara (Deena), Ayman and Halimatu Sa’diyyah.

References 

Living people
Governors of Kwara State
1947 births
Chiefs of Army Staff (Nigeria)